Ismaïl Sghyr (born March 16, 1972, in Taroudannt) is a French-Moroccan long-distance runner. He won a bronze medal at the over 3000 metres at the 1997 IAAF World Indoor Championships. In 5000 metres he finished fourth at the World Championships the same year, as well as winning a bronze medal at the 2002 European Championships. Over 10,000 metres he won at the 1997 Mediterranean Games.

Sghyr formerly represented Morocco, but as many other Moroccan runners he switched nationality to France.

External links
 
 

1972 births
Living people
People from Taroudannt
French male long-distance runners
Moroccan male long-distance runners
Olympic athletes of France
Athletes (track and field) at the 1996 Summer Olympics
Athletes (track and field) at the 2004 Summer Olympics
World Athletics Championships athletes for France
World Athletics Championships athletes for Morocco
European Athletics Championships medalists
French sportspeople of Moroccan descent
Mediterranean Games gold medalists for Morocco
Athletes (track and field) at the 1997 Mediterranean Games
Mediterranean Games medalists in athletics